George Maddison (14 August 1902 – 18 May 1959) was an English footballer who played for Birtley Colliery, Tottenham Hotspur and Hull City.

Football career 
Maddison began his career at Birtley Colliery before joining Tottenham Hotspur in 1922. He made a total of 41 appearances in all competitions for the White Hart Lane club between 1922 and 1923.

Maddison, a commanding goalkeeper signed for Hull City in June 1924. and made his debut at home against Stockport County on 8 November 1924. He holds the second most league appearances for Hull City, with 430 league appearances for the club between 1924 and 1938.

Honours 
Hull City
 Football League Division Three North 1932–1933 Winners

References

1902 births
People from Little Hulton
1959 deaths
English footballers
English Football League players
Association football goalkeepers
Tottenham Hotspur F.C. players
Hull City A.F.C. players